Vyacheslav or Viacheslav Kuznetsov may refer to:

 Vyacheslav Nikolayevich Kuznetsov (born 1947), Belarusian politician who served as Acting Chairman of the Supreme Soviet in 1994
 Vyacheslav Kuznetsov (cyclist) (born 1989), Russian cyclist
 Vyacheslav Kuznetsov (composer) (born 1955), Belarusian classical music composer
 Vyacheslav Kuznetsov (footballer) (born 1962), Russian football player (senior career 1979–1997) and coach (since 2003)